Vivos is the fifth album of the Puerto Rican rock band Sol D'Menta and their second live album. It was recorded during the band's presentation at the Tito Puente Amphitheatre on May 24, 2002.

Track listing 
 "El Principio"
 "Locomotora"
 "El Velo de La Verdad"
 "Lánzate"
 "Voices in My Head" 
 "Calle Luna, Calle Sol" 
 "Perro Callejero"
 "La Calle"
 "Padre"
 "Funkadelicpsycomenta"
 "¿El Concepto?"
 "Sentido Contrario"
 "Rebeldia"
 "Skalamientos"
 "La Roquinqueña"
 "Oubao Moin"

Musicians

Band Members
 Omar Hernández - vocals
 Erick "Jey" Seda - bass
 Miguel "Tito" Rodríguez - guitar
 Ernesto "Che" Rodríguez - drums

Personnel
 Recording, Master, Editing Engineer - Eddie Román from ER Sound 
 Mastered by Carlitos Guzmán at Mastering Services

2002 live albums
Sol D'Menta albums